Croatian names follow complex and unique lettering, structuring, composition, and naming customs that have considerable similarities with most other European name systems and with those of other Slavic peoples in particular.

Upon the Croatian populace's arrival on what is currently modern-day continental Croatia in the early 7th century, Croats used Slavic names and corresponding naming customs. With modernization and globalization in the last century, given names and surnames have expanded past typical Slavic traditionalism and have included borrowed names from all over the world. However, although given names vary from region to region in Croatia and can be heavily influenced by other countries' names, surnames tend to be Slavic. Croatian names usually, but not always, consist of a given name, followed by a family name; however certain names follow naming customs that diverge from the norm. Naming customs have been a part of Croatian culture for over 400 years.

Historically, Croatian royalty were all given traditional titles of nobility designating them with certain privileges and social standing; the titles were usually followed by the full name or simply their surname. In modern-day society, families all over the country use honorific titles when speaking to family members who are older or as a sign of general respect. Traditionally, only close friends or direct family members address each other by their first names.

Style and form of address

Nobility 

During 925 - 1102, the Kingdom of Croatia's nobility had various titles and forms of address that varied from region to region and position to position. The King of Croatia was afforded the right of choosing his royal handle, for example in 1941, Prince Adimone, Duke of Aosta, took the name of King Tomislav II upon his succession to the Croatian throne. Titles were exclusive to members of the King's High Court and included the Queen consort and the following:
 Duke (the highest ranking a noble could receive in his majesty's court)
 Marquess (a lineage rank through European peerage)
 Count (a successive rank to the Marquess)
 Baron (title of honor bestowed on a civilian whose actions warranted the title)
The titles were usually followed by the full name or more commonly by their surname.

Government 

The Government of Croatia, which includes its executive branch and parliament, employ selected titles usually corresponding to position or powers. Titles are also bestowed on members of the Croatian Judiciary.

Prime ministerial style 
 Predsjednik Vlade (Prime Minister (PM) of Croatia; the title is usually followed by the name of the incumbent)
 His/Her Excellency (For the preface of the PM on foreign travel or amidst diplomatic work)
 Premijer (unofficial; this title is also usually followed by the name of the incumbent)

Presidential style 
 Predsjednik (President of Croatia; the title is also usually followed by the surname of the incumbent)

Parliamentary style 
 Predsjednik Sabora (Speaker of the Croatian Parliament; title followed by full legal name)
 Mister/Madam Speaker (ditto)

Judicial style 
 His/Her Honor (For judges on the Judiciary of Croatia and Constitutional Court of Croatia)

Honorific titles 
It is common etiquette in Croatia to address members of society with honorific titles as a sign of respect and societal distance. It is only with close friends or direct family members that first names are used. Honorific titles include the following and are usually followed by the surname of the addressed.
 Gospodin (corresponding to Mr. or Sir in English and Monsieur in French)
 Gospođa (corresponding to Ms. or Mrs. in English and Madame in French)
 Gospođica (corresponding to Miss in English and Mademoiselle in French)

Croatian given names

History 
Since their 7th century arrival in today's homeland, Croats have used Slavic names. Through the following centuries, foreign names were also accepted, especially those that mark Christian faith. However, Slavic names remained dominant until the Council of Trent (1545–63) when the Catholic church decided that every Christian should have Christian name instead of native one. This lasted until the 19th century, when Croats again started to use neglected traditional names—especially those of mediæval Croatian kings and dukes. More recently, as a result of globalization, unusual and exotic names of various cultures have also gained in wide spread popularity.

Frequency 
According to 2011 Census in Croatia, the most frequent male names are Ivan, Marko, Josip, Stjepan and Tomislav, and the most common female names include Marija, Ana and Ivana.

The 2011 census data by decade of birth shows other common given names depending on the decade, including Željko, Mario, Ivica, Luka, Franjo, Ante, Damir for males and Kata, Dragica, Nada, Ljubica, Vesna, Mirjana for females.

Traditional Croatian names 

Some common Croatian names of Slavic origin include:

Feminine:

Berislava, Blaga, Blagica, Bogdana, Bogomila, Bogumila, Borka, Borislava, Božena, Bożena, Božica, Božidarka, Branimira, Branka, Buga, Cvita, Cvijeta, Danica, Davorka, Divna, Dragana, Dragica, Dragomirka, Dragomira, Draginja, Dragina, Draga, Draženka, Dražena, Dubravka, Dunja, Hrvoja, Hrvojka, Jasenka, Jasna, Ljuba, Ljubica, Mila, Milica, Miljenka, Mislava, Mira, Mirjana, Mirka, Misirka, Mirna, Mojmira, Morana, Nada, Neda, Nediljka, Nevenka, Ognjenka, Ranka, Rašeljka, Ratka, Ruža, Ružica, Sanja, Slava, Slavica, Slavenka, Smiljana, Spomenka, Srebrenka, Stanislava, Stana, Stanka, Snješka, Snježana, Sunčana, Sunčica, Tjeha, Tihana, Tihomila, Tuga, Vedrana, Vera, Verica, Vjera, Vesna, Vjekoslava, Vlasta, Vlatka, Zdenka, Zlata, Zora, Zorica, Zorka, Zrinka, Zrina, Zvjezdana, Zvonimira, Zvonka, Željka, Živka

Masculine:

Berislav, Berivoj, Blago, Bogdan, Bojan, Boris, Borislav, Borna, Božetjeh, Božidar, Božo, Bratislav, Budimir, Branimir, Brajko, Branko, Braslav, Bratoljub, Cvitko, Cvjetko, Časlav, Častimir, Čedomir, Dalibor, Damir, Darko, Davor, Desimir, Dobroslav, Dobrovit, Domagoj, Dragan, Drago, Dragoslav, Dragutin, Dragomir, Dražen, Držiha, Držislav, Godemir, Gojko, Gojislav, Gojslav, Goran, Grubiša, Hrvatin, Hrvoj, Hrvoje, Hrvoslav, Kazimir, Kažimir, Jasenko, Klonimir, Krešimir, Krševan, Lavoslav, Ljubomir, Ljudevit, Milan, Mile, Milivoj, Milovan, Miljenko, Mirko, Miroslav, Miroš, Mislav, Mladen, Mojmir, Mutimir, Nediljko, Nedjeljko, Nenad, Ognjen, Ostoja, Ozren, Predrag, Pribislav, Prvan, Prvoslav, Prvoš, Radimir, Radomir, Radoš, Rajko, Ranko, Ratimir, Ratko, Rato, Radovan, Radoslav, Slaven, Slaviša, Slavoljub, Slavomir, Smiljan, Spomenko, Srebrenko, Srećko, Stanislav, Stanko, Strahimir, Svetoslav, Tihomil, Tihomir, Tješimir, Tomislav, Tomo, Tvrtko, Trpimir, Vatroslav, Većeslav, Vedran, Velimir, Veselko, Vidoslav, Vjekoslav, Vjenceslav, Višeslav, Vitomir, Vjeran, Vladimir, Vlado, Vlatko, Vojmil, Vojnomir, Vuk, Zdenko, Zdeslav, Zdravko, Zorislav, Zoran, Zrinko, Zrinoslav, Zlatko, Zvonimir, Zvonko, Žarko, Želimir, Željko, Živko

Christian names 

Aleksandar, Ana (Anna), Ante or Antun (Anthony), Andrija (Andrew), Danijel, David, Dominik, Edvard, Filip, Franjo (Francis), Fridrik, Grgur (Gregory), Henrik, Ilija (Elijah), Ivan (John), Jakov (Jacob), Josip (Joseph), Juraj (George), Karlo (Charles), Katarina (Catherine), Kristofor, Lav (Leo), Ljudevit (Lewis),  Lovro (Lawrence), Luka (Luke), Marko (Mark), Marija (Mary), Matej (Matthew), Mihael, Mihovil, Mihajlo (Michael), Nikola, Nikša, Niko, Mikula (Nicholas), Pavao (Paul), Petar (Peter), Pero (Peter), Rikard, Sebastijan, Silvestar, Šimun (Simon), Stjepan, Stipan, Stipe (Stephen), Toma (Thomas), Vasilije, Vilim (William), Vinko (Vincent).

Borrowed or foreign names 

Due to globalization and remnants of historical significance (i.e. Croatia–Italy relations, Illyrian Provincial nationalism, etc.) many people in Croatia have American, French, Swedish, Finnish, German, Italian and English first names (given names). However, due to the alphabetical limitation of Croatian many names take on new pronunciations, are respelled, or are restructured to comply with the country's naming customs. Uncharacteristic names by nationality of origin include: (American): Thomas, Charles, Max, Jacob, William, Isabella, Emma, Madison, Matthew, Alexander; (German): Hans, Peter, Stephan, Gerhard, Edith, Gabriele, Monika, Wolfgang, Dennis; (French): Jean-Louis, Lucus, Marie, Clément, Camille, Baptiste, Léonie, Julien, Françoise, Jeanne; (Italian): Alessandro, Andrea, Alessia, Claudia, Christian, Riccardo, Luca, Matteo, Leonardo, Sofia ...

Croatian family names 

Family names started to appear among Croats in the 12th century. Since the Council of Trent, both the given and family names would be written down.

Origins

Croatian family names have five different origins:

 Given names, matronymics and patronymics  Anić, Blažević, Ivanec, Marić, Stipanov ... 
 Professional names  Kovač (blacksmith), Klobučar (hatmaker), Lončar (potter), Tkalčić (weaver), Stolar (carpenter) ... 
 Nicknames  Debeljak, Crnić, Obad ... 
 Toponyms  Duvnjak (from Duvno), Kuprešak (from Kupres), Bosanac (Bosnian), Posavec (from Posavina), Zagorec (from Hrvatsko Zagorje), ... 
 Ethnic designation  Hrvat, Horvat, Hrvatin, Horvatinčić ... (Croat), Čerkez (Circassians), Čeh (Czech), Mađar (Hungarians), Vlahović (Vlachs) ... :

Frequency 
The 2011 Croatian census registered the following as the most frequent Croatian family names:
 Horvat
 Kovačević
 Babić
 Marić
 Jurić
 Novak
 Kovačić
 Knežević
 Vuković
 Marković

Naming customs 

Naming customs vary from region to region in Croatia and differ slightly from that of typical naming customs, such as Brazilian and Portuguese customs; Croatian naming customs closely mimic that of Roman naming conventions.

For instance, in the Brod-Posavina, Dubrovnik, Karlovac, Krapina, Osijek, Pazin, and Slavonski Brod regions, naming traditionally, but not always, follows this structure:

Example: If "Darko Stevnich Horatio Horvat" is the full legal name of a resident of Brod-Posavina, tradition would dictate that his family name would be "Horatio" and not the assumed "Horvat" (which is another given name, usually named after the family's patriarch); this person would go by "Darko (given name) Horatio (family name)".

In selected regions of Međimurje and Šibenik, naming custom diverge again. Many residents traditionally go by their middle names and reserve the full declaration of their names for formal occasions such as court, marriage, or death.

Example: If "Kolinada Blaga Lončar" is the full legal name of a resident of one of these regions, she could choose to go by, and legally declare her name as, "Blaga Lončar."

In this region of the country, the following mechanism is usually used in naming, one that has been in practice for over four centuries:  
 The oldest son is named after the father's father.   
 The oldest daughter is named after the father's mother.   
 The second oldest son is named after the mother's father.   
 The second oldest daughter is named after the mother's mother.  
Other children of the father are either named after favorite aunts or uncles or sometimes, after the saint of the day they were born.

See also 
 Name of Croats
 Slavic names
 Slavic surnames

References

Further reading
Petar Šimunović - Leksik prezimena Socijalističke Republike Hrvatske (1976)
Petar Šimunović - Naša prezimena – porijeklo, značenje, rasprostranjenost (1985)
Petar Šimunović - Hrvatska prezimena (1995)
Petar Šimunović - Hrvatski prezimenik I-III (2008)
Petar Šimunović - Hrvatska u prezimenima (2008)
Petar Šimunović - Uvod u hrvatsko imenoslovlje (2009)

External links 
 Law about given name in Republic of Croatia 
 Croatian given names 
 Meaning of some Croatian family names 
 Site about Croatian names 

Name
Names by culture
Slavic-language names